List of Scottish novelists is an incomplete alphabetical list of Scottish novelists. It includes novelists of all genres writing in English, Scots, Gaelic or any other language. Novelists writing in the Scottish tradition are part of the development of the novel in Scotland.

This is a subsidiary list to the List of Scottish writers.

A

B

C

D

E

F

G

H

J

K

L

M

N

O

P

Q

R

S

T

U

W

See also
List of novelists
List of Scottish science fiction writers

References

Lists of British writers
Novelists
Lists of novelists by nationality
 
Novelists